This is a list of Turkish NUTS1 statistical regions by Human Development Index as of 2023 with data for the year 2021.

Development 1990–2018 
Human Development Index of Turkish statistical regions since 1990.

See also
List of countries by Human Development Index
List of Turkish provinces by GDP

References 

Turkey
Human Development Index
Turkey